Joseph-Claude-Anthelme Récamier (6 November 1774 – 28 June 1852) was a French gynecologist.

He was born in Cressin-Rochefort, Ain. For much of his professional career he was associated with the Hôtel-Dieu de Paris, where in 1806 he became chief physician. He was also a professor at the Collège de France and a member of the Faculté de médecine.

Récamier is credited with the popularization of several instruments in gynecological medicine, including the curette, vaginal speculum and the uterine sound. In his 1829 treatise Recherches sur le traitement du cancer, he coined the term "metastasis" as a definition for the spread of cancer.

"Récamier's operation" is a term used for curettage of the uterus.

Selected writings 
 Recherches sur le traitement du cancer (Research on Treatment of Cancer); 1829.
 Recherches sur le traitement du cholera-morbus (Research on Treatment of Cholera); 1832.

References 
 This article is based on a translation of an article from the French Wikipedia.
 Short biography
 Accoucheur's Antique

1774 births
1852 deaths
People from Ain
19th-century French physicians
18th-century French physicians
French gynaecologists